The 1883 Southern Rugby Union season was the 10th season of the Sydney Rugby Premiership. Twelve clubs competed from May till August 1883. The season culminated in the Premiership, which was won by Redfern. This was the first premiership in which the winner was awarded the Gardiner Cup. Redfern were crowned Premiers at a committee meeting of the Union.

Teams 
By the beginning of the season, the Southern Rugby Football Union had 37 clubs signed up as part of the Union. Out of these, 24 resided within the Sydney area with 6 representing a school or college. This left 18 clubs based within Sydney, independent of any school. Some of these clubs were considered to be "Senior" Clubs with the others called "Junior" Clubs.

It is not clear whether all clubs were eligible for the Premiership or a select group were. According to the Sydney Club Rugby discussion board on the Green and Gold Rugby website, 12 clubs competed for the Premiership. However, in the Australian Town and Country Journal, they state that these were only the principal clubs. This indicates that more clubs were considered when deciding upon the Premier Club. The Paddington Club was included in the list in the Australian Town and Country Journal, but was not included as a member club of the Union. They may have signed on at a later date.

Rule Changes
The rules were changed at the beginning of the season determining who was the victor in a match. Previously, games were decided by the number of goals scored irrespective of tries scored. The new system involved awarding points to tries and goals with the winner of the match being the team with the greatest number of points. As a result of this change, it was noticed that game tactics had changed with players working towards tries rather than goals. Some lamented this and suggested that the system be improved to encourage more kicking.

Season Summary
The 1883 SRFU Sydney Rugby Premiership was the first season to award the Premiers with the Gardiner Cup. This was a trophy sponsored by Mr W Gardiner for a football competition known as a 'challenge cup'. Unfortunately, the Union found it difficult to organise such a competition due to the lack of suitable playing fields and the disorganisation of club engagements. One of the biggest problems with matches was the encroachment of spectators onto the playing field. This would result in games being suspended. Police intervention was sought after to ensure games could continue uninterrupted. At the beginning of the season, the Union was able to arrange for a section of the grounds at Moore Park in the control of the Agricultural Society of NSW to be used for football matches.

The organisation for the Gardiner Cup was still unsettled by 14 June. At a meeting of the Southern Rugby Football Union, a suggestion was made to award the Cup to the Premiers of the season, as decided by the committee of the Union.

Premiers for 1883 were the Redfern Football Club. The first fifteen were undefeated for the season with only 11 points scored against them. Matches included games played against Junior teams. Their second game against Sydney University resulted in their opponents unable to form a team to play against them. President of the club was the Hon. Edmund Barton.

At the time, the Premiership was decided by a committee of the Union. It was not clear how the Union decided upon the Premier club. When the season had concluded, it was suggested that the relative positions of the clubs should not be left up to the allotment of the Union. It was suggested that a set of rules be arranged at the beginning of the season to determine the champion and what was needed to obtain the premiership.

Ladder

1883 Gardiner Cup

 The ladder shown above only includes the principal clubs competing during the season. Other clubs that may have competed and were eligible for the Premiership are not shown.

Representative Games

Intercolonial Matches 
After the success of the previous season's games, a New South Wales team was sent to Brisbane to compete against a Queensland team in two intercolonial matches. This was the first time that a representative team had been sent by the Southern Rugby Football Union. The first match saw a thrilling game with Queensland snatching the win 12 points to 11. Pratten ran the entire length of the field to score the winning try. At the conclusion of the game, the enthusiastic Queensland crowd carried Pratten from the field. The second match saw New South Wales win the game 13 points to nil surprising the Queensland crowd. The NSW forwards displayed superior power with the team showing superb passing.

References

External links
 Sydney Club Rugby History.
 NSW Waratahs All-time player list.
 Queensland Reds All-time player list. 

1883 in Australian sport
1883 in rugby union
Rugby union competitions in New South Wales